A late bloomer is a person whose talents or capabilities are not visible to others until later than usual.

Late bloomer or Late bloomers may also refer to:
 Late Bloomers (2006 film) (German: Die Herbstzeitlosen), 2006 Swiss film directed by Bettina Oberli
 Late Bloomers (2011 film), 2011 France film directed by Julie Gavras
 Late Bloomer (2004 film), (Japanese: Osoi Hito), 2004 Japanese film directed by Go Shibata
 The Late Bloomer, 2016 film based on Ken Baker memoir
 Late Bloomer, 2003 album by rapper Twisted Black
 "Late Bloomer", a song from the 2014 album The Voyager by Jenny Lewis
 Late Bloomer, 2017 album by rapper Wes Period
 Late Bloomers, 2023 Music video by H-Burns with Lou Gala & Phenix Brossard